This is a list of AIDS-related topics, many of which were originally taken from the public domain U.S. Department of Health Glossary of HIV/AIDS-Related Terms, 4th Edition. 



A 
AACTG –
acquired immunity –
acquired immunodeficiency syndrome (AIDS) –
ACT UP/Golden Gate –
active immunity –
acupuncture –
acute HIV infection –
Acute HIV Infection and Early Diseases Research Program (AIEDRP) –
ADAP –
ADC –
adenopathy –
adherence –
adjuvant –
administration –
Adult AIDS Clinical Trials Group (AACTG) –
adverse drug reaction –
aerosolized –
AETC –
agammaglobulinemia –
Agency for Healthcare Research and Quality (AHRQ) –
AHRQ –
AIDS –
AIDS Arms –
AIDS dementia complex (ADC) –
AIDS Drug Assistance Programs (ADAP) –
AIDS education and training centers (AETC) –
AIDS orphan –
AIDS research advisory committee (ARAC) –
AIDS service organization (ASO) –
The AIDS Show –
AIDS Vaccine 200 –
AIDS Vaccine Advocacy Coalition –
AIDS wasting syndrome –
AIDS-related cancer –
AIDS-related complex (ARC) –
alkaline phosphatase –
alopecia –
alpha interferon (INFa) –
alternative medicine –
alveolar –
amebiasis –
amino acids –
anaphylactic shock –
anemia –
anergy –
angiogenesis –
angiomatosis –
anorexia –
antenatal –
antibiotic –
antibodies –
antibody-dependent cell-mediated cytotoxicity (ADCC) –
antibody-mediated immunity –
antifungal medication –
antigen –
antigen presentation –
antigen-presenting cell (APC) –
antineoplastic –
antiprotozoal –
antiretroviral drugs –
antisense drugs –
antitoxins –
Antiviral drug –
aphasia –
aphthous ulcer –
apoptosis –
approved drugs –
ARC –
Armenicum –
ART –
arthralgia –
ASO –
aspergillosis –
assembly and budding –
asymptomatic –
ataxia –
attenuated –
autoantibody –
autoimmunization –
autoinoculation –
autologous –
avascular necrosis (AVN) –
AVN

B 
B-cell lymphoma –
B cells –
B lymphocytes (B cells) –
bactericidal –
bacteriostatic –
bacterium –
baculovirus –
baseline –
basophil –
bDNA test –
beta-2 microglobulin (β2M) –
bilirubin –
bioavailability –
biological response modifiers (BRMs) –
biopsy –
biotechnology –
blinded study –
blips –
blood–brain barrier –
body fat redistribution (BFR) syndrome –
body fluids – 
bone marrow –
bone marrow suppression –
booster –
branched DNA assay –
breakthrough infection –
Broadway Cares/Equity Fights AIDS –
bronchoscopy –
budding –
buffalo hump –
bugchasing and giftgiving – 
Burkitt's lymphoma

C 
C-T scan (computed tomography scan) –
cachexia –
Canadian Foundation for AIDS Research –
candida –
candidiasis –
carcinogen –
CAT scan –
CCR5 –
CD4 (T4) or CD4 + cells –
CDC National Prevention Information Network (CDC-NPIN) –
cell lines –
cell-mediated immunity (CMI) –
cellular immunity –
Centers for Disease Control and Prevention (CDC) –
Centers for Medicare and Medicaid Services (CMS) – 
central nervous system –
cerebrum –
cerebrospinal fluid (CSF) –
cervical cancer –
cervical dysplasia –
cervical intraepithelial neoplasia (CIN1, CIN2, CIN3) –
cervix –
chancroid –
chemokines –
chemoprophylaxis –
chemotherapy –
Chlamydia –
chronic idiopathic demyelinating polyneuropathy (CIPD) –
circumoral paresthesia –
clade –
clinical endpoint –
clinical latency –
clinical practice guidelines –
clinical trial –
clinicaltrials.gov –
cloning –
CMS –
CMV –
CNS –
co-receptors –
coccidioidomycosis –
codon –
cofactors –
cognitive impairment –
cohort –
colitis –
combination therapy –
community planning –
Community Programs for Clinical Research on AIDS (CPCRA) –
community-based clinical trial (CBCT) –
community-based organization (CBO) –
compassionate use –
complement –
complement cascade –
complementary and alternative therapy –
complete blood count (CBC) –
computed tomography scan (C-T scan) –
concomitant drugs –
condyloma –
condyloma acuminatum –
contagious –
contraindication –
controlled trials –
core –
core protein –
correlates of immunity/correlates of protection –
creatinine –
cross-resistance –
cryotherapy –
cryptococcal meningitis –
cryptococcosis –
Cryptococcus neoformans –
cryptosporidiosis –
Cryptosporidium –
CSF –
CTL –
cutaneous –
CXCR4 –
cytokines –
cytomegalovirus (CMV) –
Cytomegalovirus retinitis –
cytopenia –
cytotoxic –
cytotoxic T lymphocyte (CTL)

D 
DAIDS –
data safety and monitoring board (DSMB) –
deletion –
dementia –
demyelination –
dendrite –
dendritic cells –
deoxyribonucleic acid (DNA) –
Department of Health and Human Services (DHHS/HHS or DHHS) –
desensitization –
diabetes mellitus (DM) –
diagnosis –
diarrhea –
diplopia –
dissemination –
division of acquired immunodeficiency syndrome (DAIDS) –
DNA –
Domain (biology) –
dose-ranging study –
dose-response relationship –
double-blind study –
drug resistance –
drug-drug interaction –
DSMB –
Duffy antigen system –
dysplasia –
dyspnea

E 
efficacy –
empirical –
encephalitis –
end-stage disease –
endemic –
endogenous –
endoscopy –
endotoxin –
endpoint –
enteric –
enteritis –
entry inhibitors –
Env –
envelope –
enzyme –
enzyme-linked immunosorbent assay (ELISA) –
eosinophil –
eosinophilic folliculitis –
epidemic –
epidemiological surveillance –
epidemiology –
epithelium –
epitope –
Epstein-Barr virus (EBV) –
erythema –
erythema multiforme –
erythrocytes –
etiology –
exogenous –
exotoxin –
expanded access –
experimental drug –
expression system

F 
fat redistribution –
FDA
FDC –
floaters –
follicle –
follicular dendritic cells (FDCs) –
Food and Drug Administration (United States)
functional antibody –
fungus –
fusin –
fusion inhibitor –
fusion mechanism –
fusion peptide

G 
GAG –
gamma globulin –
gamma interferon –
ganglion –
GART –
gastrointestinal (GI) –
gene –
gene therapy –
genetic engineering –
genital ulcer disease –
genital warts –
genitourinary tract –
genome –
genotypic assay –
germinal centers –
giardiasis –
globulins –
glycoprotein –
gonorrhea –
gp120 (gp120) –
gp160 (gp160) –
gp41 (gp41) –
granulocyte –
granulocyte macrophage-colony stimulating factor (GM-CSF) –
granulocyte-colony stimulating factor (G-CSF) –
granulocytopenia

H 
HAART –
hairy leukoplakia –
half-life –
HAM/TSP –
Health Care Financing Administration (HCFA) –
Health Resources and Services Administration (HRSA) –
HELLP syndrome –
helper T cells –
helper/suppressor ratio (of T cells) –
hematocrit –
hematotoxic –
hemoglobin –
hemolysis –
hemophilia –
hepatic –
hepatic steatosis –
hepatitis –
hepatitis C and HIV coinfection –
hepatomegaly –
herpes simplex virus 1 (HSV-1) –
herpes simplex virus 2 (HSV-2) –
herpes varicella zoster virus (VZV) –
herpes viruses –
highly active antiretroviral therapy (HAART) –
histocompatibility testing –
histoplasmosis –
HIV disease –
HIV prevention trials network (HPTN) –
HIV set point –
HIV vaccine trials network (HVTN) –
HIV-1 –
HIV-2 –
HIV-associated dementia –
HIV-related tuberculosis –
HLA –
Hodgkin's disease –
holistic medicine –
homology (biology) –
hormone –
host –
host factors –
HPTN –
HPV –
HRSA –
HTLV-I –
HTLV-I-associated myelopathy/tropical spastic paraparesis (HAM/TSP) –
HTLV-II –
human growth hormone (HGH) –
human immunodeficiency virus type 1 (HIV-1) –
human immunodeficiency virus type 2 (HIV-2) –
human leukocyte antigens (HLA) –
human papilloma virus (HPV) –
human T cell lymphotropic virus type I (HTLV-I) –
human T cell lymphotropic virus type II (HTLV-II) –
humoral immunity –
HVTN –
hydroxyurea –
hypergammaglobulinemia –
hyperglycemia –
hyperlipidemia –
hyperplasia –
hyperthermia –
hypogonadism –
hypothesis –
hypoxia

I 
idiopathic –
idiopathic thrombocytopenia purpura –
IHS –
immune complex –
immune deficiency/immunodeficiency –
immune response –
immune system –
immune thrombocytopenic purpura –
immunity –
immunization –
immunocompetent –
immunocompromised –
immunodeficiency –
immunogen –
immunogenicity –
immunoglobulin (Ig) –
immunoglobulin A (IgA) –
immunoglobulin D (IGD) –
immunoglobulin E (IGE) –
immunoglobulin G (IGG) –
immunoglobulin M (IGM) –
immunomodulator –
immunostimulant –
immunosuppression –
immunotherapy –
immunotoxin –
in vitro –
in vivo –
incidence –
Incubation period –
IND –
Indian Health Service (IHS) –
infection –
infectious –
informed consent –
infusion –
inoculation –
institutional review board (IRB) –
integrase –
integrase inhibitors –
Interaction –
interferon –
interleukin-1 (IL-1) –
interleukin-2 (IL-2) –
interleukin-4 (IL-4) –
interleukin-12 (IL-12) –
interleukins –
International Center for Research on Women – 
intramuscular (IM) –
intravenous –
intravenous immunoglobulin (IVIG) –
intravitreal –
Investigational New Drug (IND) –
IRB –
ITP –
IVIG

J 
jaundice –
JC virus

K 
Kaposi's sarcoma (KS) –
Karnofsky score –
killer T cells –
KSHV –
Kupffer cells

L 
Langerhans cells –
LAS –
lentivirus –
lesion –
leukocytes –
leukocytosis –
leukopenia –
leukoplakia –
LFT –
LIP –
lipid –
lipodystrophy –
liposomes –
live vector vaccine –
liver function test (LFT) –
long terminal repeat sequence (LTR) –
long-term nonprogressors –
LTR –
lumbar –
lumbar puncture –
lymph –
lymph nodes –
lymphadenopathy syndrome (LAS) –
lymphatic vessels –
lymphocyte –
lymphoid interstitial pneumonitis (LIP) –
lymphoid organs –
lymphoid tissue –
lymphokine-activated killer cells (LAK) –
lymphokines –
lymphoma –
lymphopenia –
lymphoproliferative response –
lysis

M 
MAC –
macrophage –
macrophage-tropic virus –
magnetic resonance imaging (MRI) –
MAI –
maintenance therapy –
major histocompatibility complex (MHC) –
malabsorption syndrome –
malaise –
malignant –
mast cell –
MedlinePlus –
mega-HAART –
memory T cells –
meninges –
meningitis –
messenger RNA –
metabolism –
metastasis –
MHC –
microbes –
microbicide –
Microsporidiosis –
mitochondria –
mitochondrial toxicity –
molecule –
molluscum contagiosum –
monocyte –
mononeuritis multiplex (MM) –
monovalent vaccine –
morbidity –
MRI –
mucocutaneous –
mucosa –
mucosal immunity –
mucous membrane –
Multicenter AIDS Cohort Study –
multi-drug rescue therapy –
multiple drug-resistant tuberculosis (MDR-TB) –
mutation –
myalgia –
mycobacterium –
mycobacterium avium complex (MAC) –
mycosis –
myelin –
myelopathy –
myelosuppression –
myelotoxic –
myocardial –
myopathy

N 
NAT –
National Cancer Institute (NCI) –
National Institute of Allergy and Infectious Diseases (NIAID) –
National Institute of Child Health and Human Development (NICHD) –
National Institutes of Health (NIH) –
National Library of Medicine (NLM) –
National Prevention Information Network (NPIN) –
natural history study –
natural killer cells (NK cells) –
NCI –
New Drug Application –
nebulized –
Nef –
neoplasm –
nephrotoxic –
neuralgia –
neurological complications of AIDS –
neuropathy –
neutralization –
neutralizing antibody –
neutralizing domain –
neutropenia –
neutrophil –
New Drug Application (NDA) –
New York Cares –
NIAID –
NICHD –
night sweat –
NIH –
NK cell –
NLM –
NNRTI –
non-Hodgkin's lymphoma (NHL) –
non-nucleoside reverse transcriptase inhibitors (NNRTI) –
non-steroidal anti-inflammatory drugs (NSAID) –
NRTI –
nucleic acid –
nucleic acid test –
nucleocapsid –
nucleoli –
nucleoside –
nucleoside analog –
nucleoside reverse transcriptase inhibitors (NRTI) –
nucleotide –
nucleotide analogs –
nucleus –
null cell

O 
ocular –
off-label use –
oncology –
open-label trial –
opportunistic infections –
oral hairy leukoplakia (OHL) –
organelle –
oropharyngeal –
orphan drugs –
osteonecrosis –
osteopenia

P 
P24 –
package insert –
palliative –
palliative care –
pancreas –
pancreatitis –
pancytopenia –
pandemic –
pap smear –
papilloma –
parallel track –
parasite –
parenteral –
paresthesia –
passive immunity –
passive immunotherapy –
pathogen –
pathogenesis –
PBMC –
PCP –
PCR –
Pediatric AIDS Clinical Trial Group (PACTG) –
pelvic inflammatory disease –
peptide –
perianal –
perinatal –
perinatal transmission –
peripheral neuritis –
peripheral neuropathy –
persistent generalized lymphadenopathy –
PGL –
phagocyte –
phagocytosis –
pharmacokinetics –
phase I trials –
phase II trials –
phase III trials –
phase IV trials –
photosensitivity –
PHS –
pituitary gland –
placebo –
placebo controlled study –
placebo effect –
plasma –
plasma cells –
platelets –
PML –
Pneumocystis jiroveci pneumonia (formerly Pneumocystis carinii or PCP) –
POL –
polymerase –
polymerase chain reaction (PCR) –
polyneuritis –
polypeptide –
polyvalent vaccine –
post-exposure prophylaxis (PEP) –
PPD test –
pre-conception counseling –
preclinical –
precursor cells –
prevalence –
primary HIV infection –
primary isolate –
primaquine –
proctitis –
prodrome –
prodrug –
progressive multifocal leukoencephalopathy (PML) –
prophylactic drug –
prophylaxis –
protease –
protease inhibitors –
protease-sparing regimen –
proteins –
protocol –
protozoa –
provirus –
pruritus –
pseudo-Cushing's syndrome –
pseudovirion –
PUBMED –
pulmonary –
purified protein derivative (PPD)

R 
radiology –
randomized trial –
rebound –
receptor (immunology) –
recombinant –
recombinant DNA –
recombinant DNA technology –
regulatory genes –
regulatory T cells –
remission –
renal –
rescue therapy –
resistance –
retina –
retinal detachment –
retinitis –
retrovirus –
REV –
reverse transcriptase –
ribonucleic acid (RNA) –
ribosome –
RNA –
route of administration –
RT-PCR –
RTI –
Ryan White C.A.R.E. act

S 
safe sex –
safer sex –
salmonella –
salvage therapy –
SAMHSA –
sarcoma –
seborrheic dermatitis –
secondary prophylaxis –
sepsis –
seroconversion –
serologic test –
seroprevalence –
serosorting –
serostatus –
serum –
serum glutamic oxaloacetic transaminase (SGOT) –
serum glutamic pyruvate transaminase (SGPT) –
sexually transmitted disease (STD) –
shingles –
SHIV –
side effects –
simian immunodeficiency virus (SIV) –
sinusitis –
social integration
SIT –
SIV –
Special Projects of National Significance (SPNS) –
spinal tap –
spleen –
splenomegaly –
sputum analysis –
standard of care –
staphylococcus –
STD –
stem cells (FDCs) –
steroid –
Stevens–Johnson syndrome –
STI –
stomatitis –
strain –
stratification –
structured intermittent therapy (SIT) –
structured treatment interruption (STI) –
study endpoint –
subarachnoid space –
subclinical infection –
subcutaneous (SQ) –
Substance Abuse and Mental Health Services Administration (SAMHSA) –
subunit HIV vaccine –
sulfa drug –
sulfonamides –
superantigen –
suppressor T cell –
surrogate marker –
surveillance –
susceptible –
symptoms –
syncytium –
syndrome –
synergy –
synergistic –
synthesis –
syphilis –
systemic

T 
T cells (T lymphocytes) –
T lymphocyte proliferation assay –
T lymphocytes –
T suppressor cells –
T4 cells (T-helper cells) –
T8 cells –
Tanner staging –
TAT –
TB –
template –
TeachAids –
teratogenicity –
testosterone –
therapeutic HIV vaccine –
thrombocytopenia –
thrush –
thymosin –
thymus –
tissue –
titer –
toxicity –
toxoplasmic encephalitis –
toxoplasmosis –
transaminase –
transcription –
transfusion –
translation –
transmission –
transplacental –
treatment IND –
triglycerides –
tuberculin skin test (TST) –
tuberculosis (TB) –
tumor necrosis factor (TNF)

V 
V3 loop –
vaccination –
vaccine –
vaccinia –
vaginal candidiasis –
valley fever –
variable region –
varicella zoster virus (VZV) –
vector –
vertical transmission –
viral burden –
viral core –
viral culture –
viral envelope –
viral load –
viremia –
viricide –
virion –
virology –
virus –
visceral

W 
wasting syndrome –
Western blot –
white blood cells –
wild-type virus –
window period –
Women's Interagency HIV Study (WIHS) –
World AIDS Day –
World AIDS Vaccine Day

Y 
yeast infection – Youth Against AIDS

Z 
zinc finger inhibitor –
zinc fingers

HIV AIDS-related articles
HIV AIDS